Shipmates is an American syndicated television show that ran for two seasons from 2001 to 2003.

Reruns later ran on the cable channel Spike TV. The show was created by Hurricane Entertainment and the executive producer was John Tomlin. Chris Hardwick was the host. Participants in the show were sent on a blind date on a Carnival Cruise ship, with camera crews following the couple around the clock.

External links
 Official Website (via the Internet Archive's Wayback Machine)
 

American dating and relationship reality television series
Television series by Sony Pictures Television
2000s American reality television series
First-run syndicated television programs in the United States
2001 American television series debuts
2003 American television series endings